The Standardization Administration of China (SAC; ;) is the standards organization authorized by the State Council of China to exercise administrative responsibilities by undertaking unified management, supervision and overall coordination of standardization work in China. The SAC represents China within the International Organization for Standardization (ISO), the International Electrotechnical Commission (IEC) and other international and regional standardization organizations; the SAC is responsible for organizing the activities of the Chinese National Committee for ISO and IEC; the SAC approves and organizes the implementation of international cooperation and the exchange of projects on standardization.

The SAC is headquartered in Haidian District, Beijing.

History
With the development through China's reforms and opening up, in April 2001, the State Council of China decided to set up the General Administration of Quality Supervision, Inspection & Quarantine of the People's Republic of China (AQSIQ), by merging the former CSBTS and the former State Bureau of Import & Export Inspection and Quarantine (CIQ SA) and, at the same time, to establish the Standardization Administration of the People's Republic of China (SAC) and Certification and Accreditation Administration of the People's Republic of China (CNCA) under AQSIQ.

Laws
Standardization Law of P.R.C.
Enforcement Regulations of Standardization Law
Management Measures of National Standards
Management Measures of Industrial Standards
Standardization Mechanism and Policy

Levels
National Standards
Industrial Standards
Local Standards
Enterprise Standards

Types
Mandatory (Health, Safety and Security)
Recommended

Standard Lifecycle
 Phase 1: Preparing Work
 Phase 2: New Proposal
 Phase 3: Workgroup Draft
 Phase 4: Consultation
 Phase 5: Examination
 Phase 6: Approval
 Phase 7: Publication
 Phase 8: Review
 Phase 9: Suppression

Related organizations
Standards and conformity assessment bodies:

The Ministry of Agriculture and Rural Affairs interfaces with the Food and Agriculture Organization and the Codex Alimentarius Commission.

The State Administration for Market Regulation (SAMR) interfaces with the IOML, the APLMF and the APEC/Sub-Committee on Standards and Conformance (SCSC).

Administration of Certification & Accreditation of China
Known as the CNCA.
 The International Inspection and Quarantine Standards and Technical Regulations Research Centre interfaces with the WTO-SPS; WTO-TBT
 The National Accreditation Board for Certifiers (CNAB) interfaces with the IAF
 The National Auditor & Training Accreditation Board (CNAT)
 The National Accreditation Board for Laboratories (CNAL) interfaces with the ILAC; APLAC
 The China Quality Certification Center (CQC)
 The China Certification & Inspection Group (CCIC)

Standardization Administration of China
The SAC interfaces with the IEC, the APEC/SCSC, the JTC 1, the ISO and the PASC.
 China Association For Standardization (CAS)
 China National Institute of Standardization (CNIS)
 Standards Press of China (SPC)
 The National Institute of Metrology (NIM) interfaces with the BIPM and the APMP.

Ministry of Industry and Information Technology
The Ministry of Industry and Information Technology (MIIT) interfaces with the ITU.
 China Electronics Standardization Institute (CESI)
 China Communications Standards Association (CCSA)
 National Information Technology Standardization Technical Committee (NITS)
 China Wireless Telecommunication Standards working Group (CWTS)
 China Standards Information Center (CSSN)
 China Electronics Standardization Association (CESA)

Technical
Technical committees
MII standard workgroups

Committees
Standardization technical committees
ISO/IEC/JTC1 National IT Standardization Technical Committee
IEC/TC82 National Solar Photovoltaic Energy System Standardization Technical Committee
 IEC/TC29 National Magnetic Element and  Ferrite Material Standardization Technical Committee
IEC/TC47 National Semiconductor Device Standardization Technical Committee
IEC/TC21/SC21A National alkaline battery Standardization Technical Committee
IEC/TC91 National Printing circuit Standardization Technical Committee
IEC/TC80 National Navigation Standardization Technical Committee
IEC/TC25 National technical standardization committee on reliability and maintainability of electronic and electrician products
IEC/TC29 China National Technical Standardization Committee on Electro-acoustics
 TC47 National Technical Committee on Printed Circuit of Standardization Administration of China

National
National Video, Audio and Multimedia system Standardization Technical Committee IEC/TC100
National All-or-nothing Relay Standardization Technical Committee IEC/TC94
National high-frequency Cable for Electronics and Connector Standardization Technical Committee IEC/TC46
National Frequency Control and Selection Standardization Technical Committee IEC/TC49
National Electronic Tube Bases Standardization Technical Committee IEC/TC39
National Electromechanical Components for Electronic Equipment Standardization Technical Committee IEC/TC48
National Electronic equipment Resistor-Capacitor Unit Standardization Technical Committee IEC/TC40
National Electronic Measuring Instrument Standardization Technical Committee

MII standard workgroups 
 Linux workgroup: Linux 
 Database workgroup: 
 AVS workgroup: AVS 
 Digital TV workgroup: 
 RFID workgroup: RFID

Standardization in key fields
National standard “Solar home system specification and test procedure” issued
New energy (solar system) -7 standards developed, for example “Testing method for LED chip”
Industrial standard “Requirements for concentration limits for certain hazardous substances in electronic information products” issued
Pollution Control
2005–2007 standardization developing plan for energy saving and comprehensive utilizing
Energy saving & consumption reduction
Standard and applications in research
RFID
“Specification for Office document format (Uniform Office Format (UOF))” issued.

See also

References

External links 
 

Standards of the People's Republic of China
Guobiao standards
Standards organizations in China
China